Thennangur,  is a town panchayat located in the Vandavasi Taluk of Tiruvannamalai district in Tamil Nadu, India. The town also  known as Dakshina Halasyam and is the site of the 25 year old, uniquely designed Sri Panduranga Hindu temple.

Location
Thennangur is located on State Highway 116, between Kanchipuram and Vandavasi, and is served by buses from both cities.

References

External links

 GA Trust
 Thennangur temple details
 The Hindu - Return to the roots

Villages in Tiruvannamalai district
Tiruvannamalai district
Cities and towns in Tiruvannamalai district